Edmundsella is a genus of sea slugs, aeolid nudibranchs, marine gastropod mollusks in the family Flabellinidae.

Species
There are three species within the genus Edmundsella:
 Edmundsella albomaculata (Pola, Carmona, Calado & Cervera, 2014)
 Edmundsella pedata (Montagu, 1816)
 Edmundsella vansyoci (Gosliner, 1994)

References

Flabellinidae
Gastropod genera